Wake Up is the debut studio album from Christian hip hop musician Swoope. The album released on March 20, 2012 by Collision Records.

Critical reception

Wake Up garnered two positive reviews from music critics. At Rapzilla, Nyon Smith rated the album four-and-a-half stars, writing that the release is "a very coherent story from beginning to end." Anthony Peronto of Christian Music Zine rated the album a perfect five stars, stating that "Swoope has crafted a creative, honest, and lyrical album that is definitely deserving of all the recognition it can get."

Chart performance
For the Billboard charting week of April 7, 2012, Wake Up charted at No. 10 and 6 on the Christian Albums and Top Gospel Albums charts, respectively, No. 23 on the Rap Albums, and No. 31 on the Independent Albums chart.

Track listing

Charts

References

2012 debut albums
Hip hop albums by American artists
Albums produced by Street Symphony
Albums produced by Swoope